WFKB-LD, virtual channel 38 (UHF digital channel 19), was a low-power Grit-affiliated television station licensed to Midland, Michigan, United States. The station was owned by the DTV America subsidiary of Innovate Corp.

History 
The station’s construction permit was initially issued on May 29, 2012 under the calls of W38FK-D and was changed to WFKB-LD.
Went off the air December 15, 2020.

Digital channels
The station's digital signal was multiplexed:

References

External links
DTV America

Low-power television stations in the United States
Innovate Corp.
FKB-LD
Television channels and stations established in 2016
2016 establishments in Michigan
Television channels and stations disestablished in 2020
2020 disestablishments in Michigan
Defunct television stations in the United States